Miss Jim 45 was a red dun Quarter Horse mare who won the 1970 American Quarter Horse Association, or AQHA,  High Point Halter Horse Award.

She was a 1966 foal, and her sire was Jim Harlan and her dam was a Waggoner Ranch mare named Miss Paulo 45. Her sire traced back to King P-234 as well as Peter McCue, Traveler and Oklahoma Star P-6. Her dam traced to many of the same sires, including King P-234, Traveler, Peter McCue and Yellow Jacket.

Show career 
She earned 436 AQHA open halter points that year, in 153 shows, placing first 139 times, second 12 times and one third and one fifth place. She was Grand Champion Mare all but 16 of those shows. Frank Merrill, who showed her to the title that year, said when he bought her, he was told by Matlock Rose that "Son, anyone could lead this horse into the ring and do just as well as me." Besides her High Point award she also earned a Superior Halter Horse award with the AQHA.

Death and honors 
She died in 1978 and in 2000 she was inducted into the AQHA American Quarter Horse Hall of Fame.

Pedigree

Notes

References
 
 American Quarter Horse Foundation - Miss Jim 45] accessed on September 3, 2017
 AQHA Hall of Fame accessed on September 1, 2017
 Beckman, Bruce "Miss Jim 45" Quarter Horse Journal November 1991 p. 36, 121, & 123
 Miss Jim 45 pedigree at All Breed Pedigree accessed on September 13, 2007
 Wagoner, Dan Quarter Horse Reference 1974 Edition Grapevine, Texas:Equine Research 1974

External links
 Miss Jim 45 at Quarter Horse Directory
 Miss Jim 45 at Quarter Horse Legends

American Quarter Horse show horses
1966 animal births
1978 animal deaths
AQHA Hall of Fame (horses)